Cychrus lilianae is a species of ground beetle in the subfamily of Carabinae. It was described by Cavazzuti in 1997.

References

lilianae
Beetles described in 1997